Amara Miller (born May 4, 2000) is an American actress known for her debut performance in the film The Descendants, for which she won a Young Artist Award.

Miller lives in Pacific Grove, California, with her parents, Ahnalisa and Michael Miller.

Filmography

References

External links

2000 births
21st-century American actresses
Actresses from California
American child actresses
American film actresses
American television actresses
Living people
People from Pacific Grove, California